John Farmery (1591–1647) was an English politician who sat in the House of Commons  in 1640. He supported the Royalist side in the English Civil War.

Farmery was the son of William Farmery, Rector of Heapham, Lincolnshire and his wife Cassandra Newland of Hackney. He was baptised at Springthorpe, Lincolnshire on 24 February 1591. He matriculated from St John's College, Cambridge at Easter 1607. He was awarded BA in 1611 and MA in 1614 and LLD in 1620. In 1624, he was incorporated at Oxford University. He was admitted as an advocate on 6 May 1637 and was chancellor of the diocese of Lincoln. 

In April 1640, Farmery was elected Member of Parliament for Lincoln in the Short Parliament. He received regimental command in the Royalist army in the civil war.
 
Farmery died at the age of 56.

Farmery married and left a son also named John.

References

1591 births
1647 deaths
English MPs 1640 (April)
Cavaliers
Alumni of St John's College, Cambridge
Alumni of the University of Oxford
People from West Lindsey District